AIK continued treading water in a disappointing season. The failure to qualify for European competitions ensured popular coach Rikard Norling got the sack, much to the dismay of the AIK supporters.

Season events
In January, AIK announced the signing of Jorge Anchén to a three-year contract from Bella Vista.

On 29 July, AIK announced the signing of Tomi Maanoja to a three-and-a-half year contract from Honka.

Squad

Transfers

In

Out

Loans out

Released

Trial

Friendlies

Competitions

Overview

Allsvenskan

League table

Results summary

Results by matchday

Results

Svenska Cupen

Squad statistics

Appearances and goals

|-
|colspan="14"|Players away on loan:

|-
|colspan="14"|Players who appeared for AIK but left during the season:

|}

Goal scorers

Clean sheets

Disciplinary record

References

AIK Fotboll seasons
AIK